Kao the Kangaroo (Polish: Kangurek Kao) is a series of platform video games developed and published by Polish studio Tate Multimedia. The protagonist and titular character, Kao, is a young Australian kangaroo fitted with a boxing outfit.

Main series

Kao the Kangaroo (2000)

The first installment was published by Titus Interactive for Microsoft Windows on November 23, 2000. The Game Boy Advance version was released on December 11, 2001.

Kao the Kangaroo: Round 2 (2003)

A sequel to Kao the Kangaroo that was released on November 4, 2003, for Windows and on April 15, 2004, for Xbox, PlayStation 2, and GameCube.

Kao the Kangaroo: Mystery of the Volcano (2005)

A sequel to Kao the Kangaroo: Round 2 and the third mainline game in the Kao the Kangaroo series. The game was released exclusively for Windows on December 2, 2005. The plot is set on an island with a giant volcano. Kao gets new skills and five companions to help him on his way.

Kao the Kangaroo (2022)

Kao the Kangaroo was released on May 27, 2022. Kao returns after a 16 year old hiatus and has to fight his way through enemies called "fighting masters" in search of his missing sister. The game was meant to keep the spirit of the original games, but have a more modern look.

Spin-offs

Kao Challengers (2005)

References

Video game franchises
 
Animal superheroes
Video games about kangaroos and wallabies
Video games set in Australia
Australian outback
Jungles in fiction
Video games developed in Poland
Video game franchises introduced in 2000